Lead(II) azide   is an inorganic compound. More so than other azides,  is explosive. It is used in detonators to initiate secondary explosives. In a commercially usable form, it is a white to buff powder.

Preparation and handling
Lead(II) azide is prepared by the reaction of sodium azide and lead(II) nitrate in aqueous solution. Lead(II) acetate can also be used.

Thickeners such as dextrin or polyvinyl alcohol are often added to the solution to stabilize the precipitated product. In fact, it is normally shipped in a dextrinated solution that lowers its sensitivity.

Production history
Lead azide in its pure form was first prepared by Theodor Curtius in 1891. Due to sensitivity and stability concerns, the dextrinated form of lead azide (MIL-L-3055) was developed in the 1920s and 1930s with large scale production by DuPont Co beginning in 1932. Detonator development during World War II resulted in the need for a form of lead azide with a more brisant output. RD-1333 lead azide (MIL-DTL-46225), a version of lead azide with sodium carboxymethyl cellulose as a precipitating agent, was developed to meet that need. The Vietnam War saw an accelerated need for lead azide and it was during this time that Special Purpose Lead Azide (MIL-L-14758) was developed; the US government also began stockpiling lead azide in large quantities. After the Vietnam War, the use of lead azide dramatically decreased. Due to the size of the US stockpile, the manufacture of lead azide in the US ceased completely by the early 1990s. In the 2000s, concerns about the age and stability of stockpiled lead azide led the US government to investigate methods to dispose of its stockpiled lead azide and obtain new manufacturers.

Explosive characteristics
Lead azide is highly sensitive and usually handled and stored under water in insulated rubber containers. It will explode after a fall of around 150 mm (6 in) or in the presence of a static discharge of 7 millijoules.

Ammonium acetate and sodium dichromate are used to destroy small quantities of lead azide.

Lead azide has immediate deflagration to detonation transition (DDT), meaning that even small amounts undergo full detonation (after being hit by flame or static electricity).

Lead azide reacts with copper, zinc, cadmium, or alloys containing these metals to form other azides. For example, copper azide is even more explosive and too sensitive to be used commercially.

Lead azide was a component of the six .22 (5.6 mm) caliber Devastator rounds fired from a Röhm RG-14 revolver by John Hinckley, Jr. in his assassination attempt on U.S. President Ronald Reagan on March 30, 1981. The rounds consisted of lead azide centers with lacquer-sealed aluminum tips designed to explode upon impact. A strong probability exists that the bullet which struck White House press secretary James Brady in the head exploded. The remaining bullets that hit people, including the shot that hit President Reagan, did not explode.

See also
 Lead styphnate

References

External links

 National Pollutant Inventory – Lead and Lead Compounds Fact Sheet

Azides
Lead(II) compounds
Inorganic compounds
Explosive chemicals